Lawrence Francis Manetti (born July 23, 1947) is an American actor best known for his role as Orville Wilbur Richard "Rick" Wright on the CBS television series Magnum, P.I. which starred Tom Selleck as the title character. He also starred in Baa Baa Black Sheep as First Lieutenant Robert A. "Bobby" Boyle, a pilot in the VMF-214 squadron headed by Greg "Pappy" Boyington (played by Robert Conrad).

Career
Manetti studied acting in Chicago with the Ted Liss Players. His first television role was as a young detective in Jack Webb's Chase (1973–74). He would go on to play pilot "Bobby Boyle" in Baa Baa Black Sheep (1976–78) with Robert Conrad. He followed this up with a role as a bookie on the short-lived NBC series, The Duke (1979), which also featured Conrad in the title role.

Manetti's signature role on Magnum, P.I. lasted for the entire eight-year run of the series (1980–88). He also had co-starring roles in 25 feature films and guest starred on many other television shows, including Rockford Files, Emergency!, Starsky & Hutch, Tenspeed and Brownshoe, Fantasy Island , Battlestar Galactica, Renegade, Quantum Leap, JAG and Walker, Texas Ranger. He also had a minor role in the 1993 film CIA II: Target Alexa.

Since July 2011, Larry and Nancy Manetti have hosted a weekly radio program on CRN Digital Talk Radio Networks.

It was announced on January 24, 2013, that Manetti had joined CBS's revived version of Hawaii Five-0 in the recurring role of "Nicky 'The Kid' Demarco". The character is described as "a local lounge legend ... [who], back in the day, was mentored by the one and only Frank Sinatra." In October 2019, he appeared in the revival of Magnum P.I., playing the same character.

Other
Manetti is the author of the semi-autobiographical Aloha Magnum, based on his time on Magnum P.I. and anecdotes about fellow cast members and celebrities such as Frank Sinatra, Elvis Presley, and Michelle Pfeiffer. He used to host a "Celebrity Brunch" and once owned a restaurant in the Plaza Hotel & Casino, which was owned by his friend D. W. Barrick of Barrick Gaming Corporation.

Books
Aloha Magnum: Larry Manetti's Magnum, P.I. Memories. Manetti, Larry & Chip Silverman (1999); Los Angeles, CA: Renaissance Books;

Selected filmography

Film
 Two-Minute Warning (1976) as The S.W.A.T. Team—Pratt
 Sudden Death (1977) as Dan
 Snapdragon (1993) as Lengle
 CIA II: Target Alexa (1993) as Radcliffe
 Fatal Pursuit (1995) as Gersi
 Top of the World (1997) as Morgan
 Scar City (1998) as Paul
 Hijack (1998) as Thomas Grady
 No Tomorrow (1999) as Lewis
 Time Served (1999) as Billy
 The Alternate (2000) as Agent Harris
 Random Acts (2001)
 The Stoneman Murders (2002) as Sgt. C. "Chickie" Mudryck
 Sinatra Club (2010) as Peg Leg Broncato
 The Man Who Shook the Hand of Vicente Fernandez (2012)

Television 
 Emergency! (1973-1978) as Paramedic (uncredited)/Bert Dwyer/Brian
 Starsky & Hutch (1975, season 1 episode 1) as Stan
 Baa Baa Black Sheep (1976–1978, TV series) as 1st Lt. Robert A. "Bobby" Boyle
 Battlestar Galactica (1978-1979) as Lt. Giles
 Tenspeed and Brown Shoe  (1979-1980) 
 Magnum, P.I. (1980–1988) as Orville "Rick" Wright/Reverend Myron Bentley
 Tales from the Darkside (1986) as Junior P. Harmon in the "Printer's Devil" episode (2/16)
 Quantum Leap (1993) as Vic
 Street Justice (1993) as Doc Nass
 Walker, Texas Ranger (1998) as Shelby
 Las Vegas (2007) as Larry
 Hawaii Five-0 (2013–2016) as Nicky "The Kid" DeMarco
 Magnum P.I.'' (2019) as Nicky "The Kid" DeMarco

References

External links
 Larry Manetti's homepage
 

American male film actors
American male television actors
Male actors from Chicago
American people of Italian descent
American memoirists
1947 births
Living people
20th-century American male actors
21st-century American male actors